"Dansez" is a single by Jessy Matador, from his second album Electro Soukouss. The song features vocals from Daddy Killa. It was released on 24 January 2011 in France and managed to peak to number 86 in the French Singles Chart. As of May, 2011, it has had over 300,000 hits on YouTube.

Track listing
Digital download
 "Dansez" (Radio edit) – 3:38

Credits and personnel 
 Lead vocals – Jessy Matador and Daddy Killa
 Producers – Wewok Team
 Lyrics – Teetoff, Jessy Kimbangi
 Label: Wagram Records

Chart performance

Release history

References

2011 singles
Jessy Matador songs
2011 songs
Wagram Music singles